Haarajoki railway station is located in the district of Haarajoki, in Järvenpää, Finland,  north of  Helsinki Central railway station.

The station was opened on 3 September 2006 as part of the new Kerava-Lahti railway line, and is served by the Z-trains which run on this route.

Services 

  commuter trains (Helsinki –Pasila – Tikkurila – Kerava – Haarajoki – Mäntsälä – Henna – Lahti)
 Additional stops following Lahti during rush hours and late at night: Villähde – Nastola – Uusikylä – Kausala – Koria – Kouvola

References

External links 
 

Railway stations in Uusimaa
Järvenpää
Railway stations opened in 2006